Georges Griffiths (24 February 1990 – 5 October 2017) was an Ivorian professional footballer who played for Hungarian sides Lombard-Pápa and Diósgyőr. While playing for AS Indenié Abengourou in Ligue 1, he scored half of his team's league goals in the 2011 league season.

Griffiths died at the age of 27 on 5 October 2017 during an aggravated robbery in which he was shot trying to prevent his car from being stolen.

References

External links
 MLSZ 

1990 births
2017 deaths
Ivorian footballers
Association football forwards
Lombard-Pápa TFC footballers
Diósgyőri VTK players
Nemzeti Bajnokság I players
Ivorian expatriate footballers
Expatriate footballers in the Czech Republic
Expatriate footballers in Hungary
Ivorian expatriate sportspeople in the Czech Republic
Ivorian expatriate sportspeople in Hungary
Footballers from Abidjan
Deaths by firearm in Ivory Coast
Ivorian murder victims
Male murder victims
People murdered in Ivory Coast